The Findlay Freedom was a semi-professional ice hockey team. The team was a member of the now defunct NEHL team based in Findlay, Ohio. They played their home games at the Clauss Ice Arena on the campus of University of Findlay. The Freedom finished the 2006-07 regular season second in the NEHL to the undefeated New England Stars

The name "Freedom" was the decision of team owners as they both felt the name would be appropriate because Findlay is known as Flag City.

External links 

North Eastern Hockey League teams
Findlay, Ohio
Ice hockey teams in Ohio
2006 establishments in Ohio